N-Ethoxycarbonyl-2-ethoxy-1,2-dihydroquinoline (EEDQ) is an irreversible dopamine-receptor antagonist.

EEDQ is also a highly specific reagent for carboxyl groups. It enables the coupling of acylamino acids with amino acid esters in high yield and without racemization.

References

Carbamates
Quinolines
Ethers
Ethyl esters